This is a list of 271 species in Exochus, a genus of ichneumon wasps in the family Ichneumonidae.

Exochus species

 Exochus abdominalis Tolkanitz, 2003 c g
 Exochus ablatus Gauld & Sithole, 2002 c g
 Exochus aenigmatosus Tolkanitz, 1999 c g
 Exochus aizankeanus Kusigemati, 1971 c g
 Exochus albiceps Walsh, 1873 c g
 Exochus albicinctus Holmgren, 1873 c g
 Exochus albifrons Cresson, 1868 c b
 Exochus alpinus (Zetterstedt, 1838) c g
 Exochus angularis Kusigemati, 1971 c g
 Exochus annulicrus Walsh, 1873 c g
 Exochus annulitarsis Thomson, 1887 c g
 Exochus antennalis Tolkanitz, 1992 c g
 Exochus antiquus Haliday, 1838 c g
 Exochus antis Tolkanitz, 2003 c g
 Exochus appendiculatus Cameron, 1902 c g
 Exochus areolatus Hedwig, 1939 c g
 Exochus argutus Tolkanitz, 1993 c g
 Exochus armillosus Townes & Townes, 1959 c g
 Exochus assimilis Kusigemati, 1984 c g
 Exochus ater Tolkanitz, 1993 c g
 Exochus atriceps Walsh, 1873 c g
 Exochus atrofemoratus Tolkanitz, 1993 c g
 Exochus avinus Gauld & Sithole, 2002 c g
 Exochus belokobylskii Tolkanitz, 2001 c g
 Exochus bessus Gauld & Sithole, 2002 c g
 Exochus bicoloripes Kusigemati, 1971 c g
 Exochus bifasciatus Kusigemati, 1971 c g
 Exochus bimaculatus Kusigemati, 1984 c g
 Exochus bolivari Seyrig, 1927 c g
 Exochus borealis Kusigemati, 1971 c g
 Exochus boxatus Gauld & Sithole, 2002 c g
 Exochus britannicus Morley, 1911 c g
 Exochus brutus Townes & Townes, 1959 c g
 Exochus bryanti Townes & Townes, 1959 c g
 Exochus canidens Townes & Townes, 1959 c g
 Exochus capnodes Townes & Townes, 1959 c g
 Exochus captus Brues, 1910 c g
 Exochus carens Tolkanitz, 2003 c g
 Exochus carnitus Gauld & Sithole, 2002 c g
 Exochus carri Schmiedeknecht, 1924 c g
 Exochus castaniventris Brauns, 1896 c g
 Exochus caudatus Kusigemati, 1971 c g
 Exochus cephalotes Tolkanitz, 2007 c g
 Exochus certus Tolkanitz, 2003 c g
 Exochus citripes Thomson, 1887 c g
 Exochus cnemidotus Townes & Townes, 1959 c g
 Exochus cohrsi Habermehl, 1923 c g
 Exochus collaborator Seyrig, 1934 c g
 Exochus compar Seyrig, 1934 c g
 Exochus compressiventris Ratzeburg, 1848 c g
 Exochus concitus Tolkanitz, 2001 c g
 Exochus consimilis Holmgren, 1858 c g
 Exochus convergens Kusigemati, 1971 c g
 Exochus convexus Tolkanitz, 2003 c g
 Exochus coronatus Gravenhorst, 1829 c g
 Exochus coronellus Morley, 1913 c g
 Exochus cuneatus Townes & Townes, 1959 c g
 Exochus curvinus Gauld & Sithole, 2002 c g
 Exochus daisetsuzanus Kusigemati, 1987 c g
 Exochus decoratus  b
 Exochus delopius Gauld & Sithole, 2002 c g
 Exochus denotatus Townes & Townes, 1959 c g
 Exochus dentifrons Townes & Townes, 1959 c g
 Exochus derasus Tolkanitz, 2003 c g
 Exochus destitutus Tolkanitz, 2003 c g
 Exochus dilatatus Tolkanitz, 2003 c g
 Exochus dominus Seyrig, 1934 c g
 Exochus dondus Gauld & Sithole, 2002 c g
 Exochus dorsalis Cresson, 1864 c g
 Exochus echigoensis Kusigemati, 1987 c g
 Exochus elimatus Townes & Townes, 1959 c g
 Exochus enodis Townes & Townes, 1959 c g
 Exochus erythrinus Holmgren, 1868 c g
 Exochus erythronotus (Gravenhorst, 1820) c g
 Exochus evetriae Rohwer, 1920 c g
 Exochus evitus Gauld & Sithole, 2002 c g
 Exochus externus Townes & Townes, 1959 c g
 Exochus farmellus Gauld & Sithole, 2002 c g
 Exochus fasciatus Strobl, 1903 c g
 Exochus fastigatus Townes & Townes, 1959 c g
 Exochus ferus Tolkanitz, 1993 c g
 Exochus fidus Tolkanitz, 2003 c g
 Exochus firmus Kusigemati, 1971 c g
 Exochus flavicaput Morley, 1913 c g
 Exochus flavidus Hellen, 1949 c g
 Exochus flavifacies Kusigemati, 1984 c g
 Exochus flavifrons Boheman, 1863 c g
 Exochus flavifrontalis Davis, 1897 c g
 Exochus flavinotum Morley, 1913 c g
 Exochus flavipes Tolkanitz, 1999 c g
 Exochus flavomarginatus Holmgren, 1856 c g
 Exochus flavonotatus Kusigemati, 1983 c g
 Exochus fletcheri Bridgman, 1884 c g
 Exochus flexus Tolkanitz, 2003 c g
 Exochus flubinus Gauld & Sithole, 2002 c g
 Exochus foveolatus Schmiedeknecht, 1924 c g
 Exochus frater Seyrig, 1934 c g
 Exochus frontellus Holmgren, 1858 c g
 Exochus fuscipennis Szepligeti, 1910 c g
 Exochus gascus Gauld & Sithole, 2002 c g
 Exochus genualis Townes & Townes, 1959 c g
 Exochus grandis Tolkanitz, 2003 c g
 Exochus gratus Tolkanitz, 2003 c g
 Exochus gravipes (Gravenhorst, 1820) c g
 Exochus gravis Gravenhorst, 1829 c g
 Exochus guttatus Tolkanitz, 1999 c g
 Exochus hiraniwensis Kusigemati, 1971 c g
 Exochus hirsutus Tolkanitz, 1993 c g
 Exochus hiulcus Townes & Townes, 1959 c g
 Exochus hormus Gauld & Sithole, 2002 c g
 Exochus horridus Tolkanitz, 2001 c g
 Exochus humerator Aubert, 1960 c g
 Exochus intermedius Morley, 1911 c g
 Exochus izbus Gauld & Sithole, 2002 c g
 Exochus jacintus Gauld & Sithole, 2002 c g
 Exochus kanayamensis Kusigemati, 1971 c g
 Exochus karazini Tolkanitz, 1993 c g
 Exochus kasparyani Tolkanitz, 2001 c g
 Exochus kaszabi Kusigemati, 1984 c g
 Exochus kozlovi Tolkanitz, 2001 c g
 Exochus krellus Gauld & Sithole, 2002 c g
 Exochus kusigematii Tolkanitz, 2007 c g
 Exochus kuslitzkyi Tolkanitz, 2003 c g
 Exochus lascus Gauld & Sithole, 2002 c g
 Exochus latiareolus Tolkanitz, 2003 c g
 Exochus latifasciatus Kusigemati, 1971 c g
 Exochus latro (Seyrig, 1934) c g
 Exochus lenis Tolkanitz, 2003 c g
 Exochus lentipes Gravenhorst, 1829 c g
 Exochus leptomma Chiu, 1962 c g
 Exochus lictor Haliday, 1838 c g
 Exochus limbatus Tolkanitz, 1993 c g
 Exochus lineifrons Thomson, 1887 c g
 Exochus litus Townes & Townes, 1959 c g
 Exochus longicaudis Chiu, 1962 c g
 Exochus lucidus Riggio & De Stefani, 1888 c g
 Exochus mandschukuonis Uchida, 1942 c g
 Exochus marginalis Kusigemati, 1984 c g
 Exochus marklini Holmgren, 1858 c g
 Exochus megadon Townes & Townes, 1959 c g
 Exochus melanius Tolkanitz, 1999 c g
 Exochus mesodon Townes & Townes, 1959 c g
 Exochus mesorufus Townes & Townes, 1959 c g
 Exochus mirus Tolkanitz, 2003 c g
 Exochus mitratus Gravenhorst, 1829 c g
 Exochus moeus Gauld & Sithole, 2002 c g
 Exochus momoii Tolkanitz, 2007 c g
 Exochus monticola Tolkanitz, 1999 c g
 Exochus montivagus Townes & Townes, 1959 c g
 Exochus morionellus Holmgren, 1858 c g
 Exochus multicinctus Strobl, 1904 c g
 Exochus multicintus Strobl, 1904 g
 Exochus muscanus Gauld & Sithole, 2002 c g
 Exochus nasuzanus Kusigemati, 1971 c g
 Exochus navitus Gauld & Sithole, 2002 c g
 Exochus nigrifaciatus Momoi, Kusigemati & Nakanishi, 1968 c g
 Exochus nigripalpis Thomson, 1887 c b
 Exochus nigriparvus Kusigemati, 1984 c g
 Exochus nubosus Gauld & Sithole, 2002 c g
 Exochus obezus Gauld & Sithole, 2002 c g
 Exochus obscurus Tolkanitz, 1999 c g
 Exochus ochreatus Townes & Townes, 1959 c g
 Exochus ornatus Momoi & Kusigemati, 1970 c g
 Exochus oshimensis Uchida, 1930 c g
 Exochus ostentatus Davis, 1897 c g
 Exochus ozanus Gauld & Sithole, 2002 c g
 Exochus pallipes (Motschoulsky, 1863) c g
 Exochus pappi Kusigemati, 1984 c g
 Exochus parnassicus Hedwig, 1939 c g
 Exochus passaventi Seyrig, 1934 c g
 Exochus pedanticus Gauld & Sithole, 2002 c g
 Exochus perfectus Kusigemati, 1983 c g
 Exochus peroniae Townes & Townes, 1959 c g
 Exochus pictus Holmgren, 1858 c g
 Exochus pilosus Tolkanitz, 2003 c g
 Exochus pleuralis Cresson, 1864 c g
 Exochus plicatus Tolkanitz, 1999 c g
 Exochus postfurcalis Townes & Townes, 1959 c g
 Exochus posticus Kusigemati, 1983 c g
 Exochus prosopius Gravenhorst, 1829 c g
 Exochus protector Seyrig, 1934 c g
 Exochus pubitus Gauld & Sithole, 2002 c g
 Exochus pulchripes Cresson, 1868 c g
 Exochus pullatus Townes & Townes, 1959 c g
 Exochus punctatus Kusigemati, 1984 c g
 Exochus puncticeps Cameron, 1886 c g
 Exochus punctus Holmgren, 1858 c g
 Exochus quadradens Townes & Townes, 1959 c g
 Exochus quadrimaculatus Schmiedeknecht, 1924 c g
 Exochus quozus Gauld & Sithole, 2002 c g
 Exochus radialis Uchida, 1932 c g
 Exochus ratzeburgi Holmgren, 1858 c g
 Exochus ravetus Gauld & Sithole, 2002 c g
 Exochus rectus Tolkanitz c g
 Exochus rombastus Gauld & Sithole, 2002 c g
 Exochus rubellus Gauld & Sithole, 2002 c g
 Exochus rubroater Schmiedeknecht, 1924 c g
 Exochus rufator Aubert, 1963 c g
 Exochus rufigaster Kusigemati, 1971 c g
 Exochus rufipleuralis Kusigemati, 1987 c g
 Exochus russeus Townes & Townes, 1959 c g
 Exochus rutilatus Townes & Townes, 1959 c g b
 Exochus saigusai Kusigemati, 1983 c g
 Exochus scutellaris Chiu, 1962 c g
 Exochus selenanae Tolkanitz, 1999 c g
 Exochus semiflavus Cushman, 1937 c g
 Exochus semilividus Vollenhoven, 1875 c g
 Exochus semirufus Cresson, 1868 c g b
 Exochus separandus Schmiedeknecht, 1924 c g
 Exochus septentrionalis Holmgren, 1873 c g
 Exochus serozus Gauld & Sithole, 2002 c g
 Exochus setaceous Kusigemati, 1971 c g
 Exochus signatus Habermehl, 1925 c g
 Exochus signifer Townes & Townes, 1959 c g
 Exochus signifrons Thomson, 1887 c g
 Exochus silus Townes & Townes, 1959 c g
 Exochus similis Tolkanitz, 1992 c g
 Exochus simulans Tolkanitz, 2003 c g
 Exochus spilotus Townes & Townes, 1959 c g b
 Exochus spinalis Townes & Townes, 1959 c g
 Exochus spurcus Kusigemati, 1984 c g
 Exochus stenostoma Townes & Townes, 1959 c g
 Exochus stenus Chiu, 1962 c g
 Exochus stramineipes Cameron, 1886 c g
 Exochus suborbitalis Schmiedeknecht, 1924 c g
 Exochus suvanus Gauld & Sithole, 2002 c g
 Exochus synosialis Tolkanitz, 1999 c g
 Exochus szepligetii Bajari, 1961 c g
 Exochus taigensis Tolkanitz, 2001 c g
 Exochus tardigradus Gravenhorst, 1829 c g
 Exochus taximus Gauld & Sithole, 2002 c g
 Exochus teborus Gauld & Sithole, 2002 c g
 Exochus tectus Tolkanitz, 1993 c g
 Exochus tegularis Ashmead, 1894 c g
 Exochus tenebrosus Townes & Townes, 1959 c g
 Exochus tenius Tolkanitz, 2003 c g
 Exochus testaceus Tolkanitz, 1999 c g
 Exochus thomsoni Schmiedeknecht, 1924 c g
 Exochus tibialis Holmgren, 1858 c g
 Exochus transversus Townes & Townes, 1959 c g
 Exochus tumulus Gauld & Sithole, 2002 c g
 Exochus turgidus Holmgren, 1858 c g
 Exochus tutor Seyrig, 1934 c g
 Exochus tuxedus Gauld & Sithole, 2002 c g
 Exochus ubus Gauld & Sithole, 2002 c g
 Exochus ulanbaatorensis Kusigemati, 1984 c g
 Exochus unidentatus Uchida, 1952 c g
 Exochus upembaensis Benoit, 1965 c g
 Exochus urzus Gauld & Sithole, 2002 c g
 Exochus utilis Tolkanitz, 2003 c g
 Exochus vafer Holmgren, 1873 c g
 Exochus vanitus Gauld & Sithole, 2002 c g
 Exochus variegatus Tolkanitz, 1993 c g
 Exochus varipes Tolkanitz, 1993 c g
 Exochus velatus Tolkanitz, 2003 c g
 Exochus ventricosus Townes & Townes, 1959 c g
 Exochus vexator Tolkanitz, 1993 c g
 Exochus villosus Tolkanitz, 2003 c g
 Exochus virgatifrons Townes & Townes, 1959 c g
 Exochus vlops Gauld & Sithole, 2002 c g
 Exochus voxanus Gauld & Sithole, 2002 c g
 Exochus wabitus Gauld & Sithole, 2002 c g
 Exochus washingtonensis (Davis, 1897) c g
 Exochus xanthopus Cameron, 1902 c g
 Exochus xarus Gauld & Sithole, 2002 c g
 Exochus xetus Gauld & Sithole, 2002 c g
 Exochus yalupus Gauld & Sithole, 2002 c g
 Exochus yasumatsui Momoi, Kusigemati & Nakanishi, 1968 c g
 Exochus yorizus Gauld & Sithole, 2002 c g
 Exochus zabus Gauld & Sithole, 2002 c g
 Exochus zyxus Gauld & Sithole, 2002 c g

Data sources: i = ITIS, c = Catalogue of Life, g = GBIF, b = Bugguide.net

Synonyms?
 Exochus incidens Thomson, 1887

References

Exochus